Ligue communiste révolutionnaire may refer to:

Revolutionary Communist League (France)
Revolutionary Communist League (Belgium)